The 2011 season was Muangthong United's 3rd season in the top division of Thai football. Muangthong finished 3rd in the Premier League and reached the play-off stage of the AFC Champions League, putting them into the AFC Cup where they reached the quarter-finals.

Players

Competitions

League

FA Cup

League Cup

Champions League

AFC Cup

References

Muangthong United F.C. seasons
Muangthong United